In the United States, the appearance of license plates is frequently chosen to contain symbols, colors, or slogans associated with the issuing jurisdiction, which are the 50 U.S. states, the District of Columbia, the five inhabited U.S. territories, and Native American tribes, each of which independently registers motor vehicles. Regular-issue license plates for passenger vehicles typically have six or seven characters, with vanity plates having up to eight characters in a few states.

Trends in serial formats

Formats for license plate numbers are consistent within the state. For example, Delaware is able to use six-digit all-numeric serials because of its low population. Several states, particularly those with higher populations, use seven-character formats of three letters and four digits, including 1ABC234 in California and ABC-1234 (with or without a space or dash) in Georgia, Michigan, Mississippi, New York, North Carolina, Ohio, Pennsylvania, Tennessee, Texas, Virginia, Washington, and Wisconsin. Other seven-character formats include Connecticut and Illinois, which use AB-12345, and Maryland, which uses 1AB2345.

Arkansas, Colorado, Florida, and New Jersey use four letters and two numbers: Arkansas uses an ABC-12D format, Colorado an ABC-D12 format, Florida a 12A-BCD format, and New Jersey an A12-BCD format. Several less-populous states—Alaska, Hawaii, Indiana, Iowa, Kansas, Louisiana, Minnesota, Nebraska, New Mexico, North Dakota, Oklahoma, Oregon, and South Carolina—use a three-letter, three-number format, namely ABC-123 or 123-ABC.

Arizona uses a distinctive format with six characters. Except for the fourth character in each serial, which is always a number, the characters in a serial can be either letters or numbers.

Serial coding
License plate numbers are usually assigned in ascending order, beginning with a starting point such as AAA-001. Thus, an observer familiar with the sequence can determine roughly when the plate was issued. In a few cases, numbers have been assigned in descending order. For example, when Virginia switched to seven characters for its standard issue in 1993, numbers beginning with AAA-1000 were already in use for extra-cost, optional-issue plates; therefore, the new standard license plates were issued in descending order from ZZZ-9999.

Expiration date
In some states, the month of expiration or the county of registration is incorporated into the plate's serial. The last number on a Massachusetts license plate indicates the month the vehicle's registration expires (for example, 1234 AB would expire in April, the fourth month; 0 indicates October expirations; and X and Y were used for November and December expirations, respectively, on commercial plates and pre-1978 passenger plates). The same applies to the first number or letter on West Virginia plates (1 to 9 for January through September, and O, N, and D for October, November, and December expirations, respectively). Additionally, the first letter of Missouri passenger plates denotes the month of expiration. The month's position within the calendar year corresponds to the letter's position within the alphabet; i.e. the letters progress from "A" and "B" for January to "Y" and "Z" for December.

County of issuance
In Alabama, Montana, Nebraska, South Dakota, and Wyoming, a one- or two-digit number representing the county of issue begins a license plate number. Standard-issue Idaho license plate numbers begin with a single-letter or a number-letter code representing the county of issue; for example, vehicles registered in Ada County start with 1A, vehicles in Twin Falls County start with 2T, and vehicles in  Valley County start with V (as there is only one county that starts with the letter V). County codes have been based on historical population figures, the county names in alphabetical order, or some combination thereof. In Montana, for example, the county codes were assigned around 1930 and have not changed since. Other states like Indiana and Tennessee also once used the practice, with Tennessee discontinuing in the 1980s and Indiana in 2008.

Four jurisdictions in the United States use letters to designate a residence where a vehicle was registered. In Hawaii, the license plates have a unique letter designation based on the island counties that residents purchased or registered the vehicles from; a vehicle with a registration number beginning with H or Z is registered in Hawai‘i County, one beginning with K is registered in Kaua‘i County, one beginning with M or L is registered in Maui County, and one beginning with any other letter (and not containing H, K, L, M, or Z) is registered in the City and County of Honolulu. In the U.S. territory of Guam, the license plates use the first two letters that are coded by village of issuance, for example, "TM-1234" refers to a vehicle that was registered by a person who lives the village of Tamuning. In the U.S. Virgin Islands, a vehicle with a registration number beginning with C is registered in St. Croix, J in St. John, and T in St. Thomas.

Several states do require vehicles to display county codes, but these codes are not part of the serial. Indiana and Ohio display two-number county codes, while Kansas plates display two-letter county codes, but these codes are placed on a sticker or are printed in the corner of the plate in a smaller font size. Texas places the county name only on the windshield registration sticker, where the car's license plate number is also printed. Florida, Georgia, Iowa, Kentucky, Mississippi, Ohio, and Tennessee place the full name of the county of registration explicitly on their standard-issue plates, although not as part of the serial. However, Florida allows its residents to choose either "Sunshine State" or "In God We Trust" in place of the county name, and Georgia allows drivers to choose the slogan "In God We Trust" in place of the county name.

Skipping characters
For various reasons related to visibility and readability, some states and territories exclude certain letters from use in their license plate serial formats. The most commonly skipped characters are I, O, and Q, with some states using only one or two of the three while others will skip all three of these letters. Other states, such as Colorado, Georgia, and South Carolina have gradually adopted one or more of these letters over a course of years after previously skipping them in order to accommodate the demands of population growth and depletion of available serial combinations. The most common argument behind skipping I, O, and Q is that they can be too easily confused with 0, 1, and other characters, particularly when there isn't adequate spacing or divider between numbers and letters.

California only uses I, O, and Q in between two other letters, for example "1AQA000". A unique example of character use is Texas, which skips all vowels along with the letter Q on passenger plates.

In amateur radio license plate issues, some states use a unique slashed zero character in place of the standard "0" character due to lack of spacing between letters and numbers. Iowa is a unique example in the use of this character, which began using the slashed zero beginning in 2012 on all standard passenger plates as opposed to the traditional symbol for zero to differentiate it from the letter "O" which is also used. In Pennsylvania, the die used for the number "0" is different than the one used for the letter "O" since the state's number dies are taller and narrower than its letter dies.

Persons with disabilities
In the states, special plates displaying the International Symbol of Accessibility are issued to persons with disabilities that entitle them to special parking privileges. Alternately, a placard, which in some jurisdictions can be hung from the rear view mirror, may be issued; the placard has the advantage of being transferred from vehicle to vehicle.

Current standard-issue passenger plate designs and serial formats 
The following tables give information on license plates currently being issued, with 2014 or later expiration dates, for private (non-commercial) use on passenger vehicles by the governments of the fifty U.S. states, the District of Columbia, the five inhabited U.S. territories, and Native American tribes. Information on serial numbering patterns is also given. Older designs and serial formats previously issued may still be valid for continued usage in certain jurisdictions; these are noted in a separate table below.

In addition to "regular" passenger plates, all jurisdictions also provide plates for other types of vehicles that may only be roughly similar in design and layout. Additionally, there has been an increasing trend in the field of "specialty" plates to promote specific causes or interests. To keep this table as simple as possible, most of these alternate types of plates will not be noted. More information may also be found within the individual articles for each state, as linked within the table. Exceptions to this guideline may be made for specialty plates that are available at no extra cost to the motorist, as these tend to be seen more commonly on the roads.

Plate types no longer issued but still valid 

Plates with the following designs and serial formats are no longer being issued but may still be valid for use in certain instances. This table does not include year of manufacture registrations.

Diplomatic license plates

Diplomatic license plates are issued by the United States Department of State to accredited diplomats.

Prior to 1984 license plates for diplomatic vehicles were provided by the jurisdiction where the foreign mission was located.  The District of Columbia provided license plates for missions headquartered in the capital, and New York provided plates for members of the United Nations, etc.  Upon passage of the Foreign Missions Act in 1984 registration authority for foreign mission vehicles was centralized with the U.S. Department of State.

From 1984 until August 28, 2007, all plates issued followed the pattern of a letter identifying the status of the owner, followed by the two-letter country code, followed by a random three or four-digit number (S AB 1234).  For member countries of the Organization of American States (OAS), a subset of that numbering pattern was allotted to vehicles based at those countries' missions to the OAS.  Plates issued to cars based at the headquarters of the United Nations in New York City were issued in the reverse format, with the three or four-digit number first, followed by the two-letter country code, followed by the status code (1234 AB S).

The location of the status codes, either as the first or last character, allows the city of assignment to be easily identified because representatives of certain countries are limited to travel in a certain radius from their base.  The status codes used until 2007 were "C" for Foreign Consul; "D" for Diplomat; "S" for Non-Diplomatic Staff; and "A" for the OAS.  Status codes used for U.N. personnel until 2007 were "A" for the U.N. Secretariat; "D" for U.N. missions and diplomatic personnel; and "S" for U.N. Staff. The rights of the driver and car under diplomatic immunity are defined by this status code.

The country codes are unique to each particular country, but do not correlate to ISO Country Codes or other standards format. For example, in the system used until 2007, France is "DJ" rather than "F", and Australia is "XZ" rather than "AUS".

See also 
 Canadian licence plate designs and serial formats

Notes

References

External links

 Website for Automobile License Plate Collectors' Association
 License Plates of North America, 1969–Present

Vehicle registration plates